Chesterfield is a brand of cigarette, named after Chesterfield County, Virginia. The brand is owned by conglomerate Altria and produced by its subsidiary Philip Morris USA.

History
A blend of Turkish and Virginia tobacco, Chesterfields were introduced by the Drummond Tobacco Company of St. Louis, Missouri in 1873. The company was acquired by American Tobacco Company in 1898, who manufactured Chesterfields until 1911. In 1912 the brand was taken over by Liggett & Myers and production moved to Durham, North Carolina.  The brand was acquired by Philip Morris (now Altria) in 1999.

Chesterfield was the first cigarette to add an extra layer of wrapping to their pack to preserve moisture (1916). In 1926, Chesterfield's "Blow some my way" advertising campaign targeted women smokers, while a 1948 advert produced for NBC claimed that the brand was "preferred by professional smokers". Chesterfield was the first cigarette to be offered in two sizes (King and Regular) in 1952.

In 2011 Philip Morris created three variations (Chesterfield Red, Chesterfield Blue and Chesterfield Menthol) for the UK market.  In 2018 Phillip Morris discontinued Chesterfield non-filter cigarettes in the United States; shortly thereafter (January 2019), the company began limited US testing of three filtered varieties: Reds (Full Flavor), Blues (Lights), and Green (Menthol).

Sponsorship

Formula 1

Chesterfield was a sponsor of the Surtees team during the 1976 Formula One season and 1977 Formula One season. A second car entered in was sponsored by Chesterfield in 1977.

Chesterfield also sponsored the BMS Scuderia Italia team in the 1993 FIA Formula One World Championship. They only sponsored the team for one season due to the retirement of the team from F1 to focus on the World Touring Car Cup.

Motorsport
Chesterfield was a sponsor of Max Biaggi's Aprilia RSV 250 from the 1994 to the 1996 Grand Prix motorcycle racing season in the 250cc World Championship. The livery of the bike was totally black with the mark on the side fairings. In the same years, Aprilia adopted the same livery in the series production of its RS road bikes (in the 50, 125 and 250 cylinder sizes). The success was so great that even today Italians are used to say "La Chesterfield" to refer to the Aprilia RS models of those years. They were also title sponsor of Tech3's championship winning 250cc campaign in 2000 with Olivier Jacque.

Dakar Rally
Chesterfield was the main sponsor of the motorcycle team "BYRD" (Belgarda Yamaha Racing Division) at the Paris-Dakar Rally from 1987 to 1994.

In addition, under the name "Chesterfield Scout" a collaboration with the enduro sport on a more private level. For example, at Yamaha in 1989, there was a "Chesterfield DT" with 125 cc, for the Yamaha XTZ 750 Super Ténéré gave it in its first model year in 1989, the color variant "Chesterfield".

Radio and TV

In the 1930s through the 1950s, Chesterfield sponsored popular radio programs. An early one was the radio series Music That Satisfies which was broadcast in 1932–1933.

The Chesterfield Hour (1939–1944) featured big bands such as those of Paul Whiteman and Glenn Miller and Fred Waring.

It was followed briefly by Johnny Mercer's Chesterfield Music Shop (1944) and then the Chesterfield Supper Club (1944–1949) which featured Perry Como and Jo Stafford with Peggy Lee replacing Stafford on some episodes beginning in 1948. Johnny Mercer originally wrote the pop standard song "Dream (When You're Feeling Blue)" as the theme song for his Chesterfield radio program; the theme for Como's Chesterfield Supper Club was the basis for "Smoke Dreams", covered by Jo Stafford, k.d. lang, and other artists.

Liggett & Myers sponsored Dragnet, both on radio and on TV, during the 1950s. The 1954 theatrical version of Dragnet also had Chesterfield product placements, such as advertisements in scenes taking place at drug stores and news counters, or cigarette vending machines. Jack Webb as Sgt. Joe Friday was seen smoking Chesterfields in the movie and TV series. The Martin and Lewis Show, on NBC radio from 1949 to 1953, was sponsored or co-sponsored for most of its run by Chesterfield. Also in the 1950s, Gunsmoke on both radio and TV was similarly sponsored primarily by Chesterfields and L&Ms.

In 1963, Rod Serling the creator of The Twilight Zone "often seen smoking a cigarette while narrating the Intro and Outro to his episodes" frequently smoked and promoted Chesterfield Cigarettes at the end of the episodes, usually following the famous quote "They Satisfy".

In the 1940s and 1950s Ronald Reagan, Bob Hope, Bing Crosby, Perry Como, and Arthur Godfrey were among Chesterfield's official spokesmen; Chesterfield being one of the primary sponsors of the radio and TV programs of these stars during that time.

Markets 
Chesterfield is sold in: Albania, Argentina, Australia, Austria, Belgium, Bosnia and Herzegovina, Brazil, Costa Rica, Croatia, Czech Republic, Estonia, Finland, France, Germany, Greece, Hungary, Israel, Italy, Kuwait, Kosovo, Latvia, Lithuania, Luxembourg, Malaysia, Mexico, Moldova, Morocco, Netherlands, New Zealand, North Macedonia, Paraguay, Poland, Portugal, Philippines, Romania, Russia, Saudi Arabia, Singapore, Slovenia, South Africa, Spain, Sweden, Switzerland, Turkey, Ukraine, United Arab Emirates, United Kingdom, United States.

In popular culture

Novels

Ian Fleming frequently makes references to different smoking products in his famous James Bond novels. The Chesterfield brand of cigarette are portrayed as one of Bond's favorites as seen in the 1959 book Goldfinger. In this novel, James Bond demands of Goldfinger's servant, "Oddjob, I want a lot of food, quickly. And a bottle of bourbon, soda and ice. Also a carton of Chesterfields, king-size..."

In numerous Stephen King novels, his characters frequently smoke Chesterfield cigarettes. In King's 2000 book On Writing, he wrote that Chesterfield was the first brand he smoked, and that his World War II veteran uncle dismissed them as "stockade cigarettes."

Television series
In the popular 2010 HBO TV series Boardwalk Empire, Agent Knox is seen giving three packs of Chesterfield cigarettes to Clayton.

In the 2020 miniseries The Queen's Gambit, Beth Harmon's adoptive mother asks Beth to run to the store to pick up three packs of Chesterfields.

Films
Humphrey Bogart frequently appeared in Chesterfield advertisements. A scene from the 1944 movie To Have and Have Not shows him with a pack of Chesterfields.

A Chesterfield placement appeared in Jean-Luc Godard's 1960 film À bout de souffle in which the cigarette smoked by the actress Jean Seberg is a Chesterfield.

Vittorio Gassman bought two packs of Chesterfield cigarettes in the movie Il Sorpasso.

In Jack Clayton's 1974 adaptation of The Great Gatsby, Gatsby (Robert Redford) splits the last Chesterfield in his pack with Nick Carraway (Sam Waterston) while the two chat on Carraway's porch. Nick Carraway is a thinly-disguised F. Scott Fitzgerald in The Great Gatsby. Fitzgerald's favorite cigarette was Chesterfield, so the scene is an accurate adaptation.

Jake Blues (John Belushi) smoked Chesterfield cigarettes in the 1980 film The Blues Brothers. Near the end of the scene at Bob's Country Bunker, Jake is seen briefly flashing a flattened and nearly empty pack of Chesterfield cigarettes, pretending it is his musician's union ID card.

In Jim Jarmusch's 1984 film Stranger Than Paradise the main characters smoke Chesterfields, at times discussing where they can purchase them.

In the 1989 film Fratelli d'Italia, Jerry Calà draws a pack of Chesterfield Reds several times.

In Quentin Tarantino's 1992 movie Reservoir Dogs, Mr. White offers Mr. Pink a Chesterfield cigarette in an attempt to calm him. In another Tarantino-penned movie, 1993's True Romance, Clarence Worley's father, Clifford, smokes a Chesterfield before his execution at the hands of Blue Lou Boyle's consigliere, Vincenzo Coccotti.

In the 1994 film The Shawshank Redemption, Red (Morgan Freeman) is seen giving a pack of Chesterfield cigarettes to Heywood (William Sadler) after losing the "Fresh Fish" bet. Heywood sniffs the cigarettes and says "Yes, Richmond, Virginia".

In the Coen brothers' 2001 The Man Who Wasn't There, a black and white neo-noir film set in 1949, the main character is an unfiltered Chesterfield chain smoker.

In the 2005 film Memoirs of a Geisha, after Pumpkin has immersed herself in World War II American soldier culture, she tells Sayuri that she only smokes Chesterfields now.

In the 2007 film Grindhouse, the actor Kurt Russell extracts a Chesterfield pack out of his pocket.

In 2018, Norman Newlander (Alan Arkin) mentions smoking Chesterfield cigarettes when he was younger in Chuck Lorre's American comedy-drama series The Kominsky Method (Season One: Episode 6, ~11min).

Music
The 1992 Jawbreaker song "Chesterfield King" refers to the cigarette twice. First, the singer shares a Chesterfield with a woman he meets in a parking lot. Later, at the end of the song, the singer gives a Chesterfield King to the woman he has been singing about.

Donald Fagen's 1982 album The Nightfly features a pack of Chesterfield Kings on the cover and the brand is also mentioned in the title song The Nightfly whereby the lyrics go: "I've got plenty of Java and Chesterfield kings..."

The closing track on Nickelback's major label debut Silver Side Up "Good Times Gone" references Chesterfield cigarettes in the first line, "Lost in on a Chesterfield..."

Celebrities
Rod Serling, creator and host of the series The Twilight Zone (1959–1964), smoked and sometimes promoted Chesterfield during his brief appearances at the end of each episode.

The Hollywood actor Paul Douglas, who died aged 52 of a myocardial infarct, advertised them.

Longtime college football coach Paul "Bear" Bryant smoked unfiltered Chesterfields, often two to three packs per day.

Lucille Ball was known to smoke Chesterfields. Because I Love Lucy was sponsored by Philip Morris, she was not supposed to be seen smoking any other brand of cigarette on set. She still smoked Chesterfields, but put them in a Philip Morris box.

Radiohead singer Thom Yorke lit up a Chesterfield Light cigarette in a 1997 video interview.

Popular big band leader Glenn Miller was sponsored by Chesterfield in the early 1940s. He was billed as Glenn Miller and his Chesterfield Orchestra. At one point during the partnership the music stands were designed to look like packs of Chesterfield cigarettes, and later was replaced by a blue banner with gold fringe that was embroidered with Glenn Miller and his Chesterfield Orchestra with two crossed cigarettes at the bottom, the top one having a red tip with emulated smoke rising from it.

It was during the Chesterfield radio broadcasts on Sunday afternoons with Glenn Miller that the female trio The Andrew Sisters skyrocketed to fame.

See also

 Tobacco smoking

References

External links

 Collection of mid-20th century advertising featuring Chesterfield cigarettes from the TJS Labs Gallery of Graphic Design.

Philip Morris brands
Liggett Group brands